The Modernista is a scotch whisky cocktail livened up by the addition of absinthe/pastis and arrack-based Swedish Punsch. It was listed in Ted Haigh's book Vintage Spirits and Forgotten Cocktails, and is also known as the Modern Maid cocktail. A bitter cocktail balanced by punsch, it has been called "a sophisticated, if challenging, beverage".

Preparation 
 2 ounces (1/2 gill, 6 cl) Scotch
 1/2 ounce (1/8 gill, 1.5 cl) Dark Jamaican rum
 1 teaspoon absinthe or pastis (Pernod, herbsaint, and richard all work)
 1/2 ounce (1/8 gill, 1.5 cl) Swedish Punsch 
 1/2 ounce (1/8 gill, 1.5 cl) fresh lemon juice
 2 dashes orange bitters
 Shake in an iced cocktail shaker, and strain into cocktail glass.
 Add a lemon twist

Variations & Similar cocktails
Some variations substitute the scotch for gin. When sloe-gin is substituted for harder-to-find Swedish Punsch, the cocktail is listed as the Modern Cocktail No2 in The Savoy Cocktail Book, or simply as the Modern cocktail.

See also 
 List of cocktails

References

Cocktails with absinthe
Cocktails with liqueur
Cocktails with rum
Cocktails with bitters
Cocktails with Scotch whisky
Cocktails with Swedish Punsch